James Freney (1719–1788) was an Irish highwayman.

Early life
James Freney was a native of County Kilkenny, and from a respectable family who had been wealthy and powerful in the region since the 13th century, having their seat at Ballyreddy Castle. But during the 1650s they lost their lands and were reduced in status.  His father, John Freney, was a servant working at the home of one Joseph Robbins at Ballyduff, Thomastown. In 1718 he married Robbins's housemaid, Alice Phelan, and their son James was born the following year at Alice's father's home at Inistioge.

He received a good education locally, including tuition in the Robbins household—and in 1742 moved to Waterford where he opened a pub with his wife Anne.

Criminal career

Unable to pay the exorbitant fees charged by the town corporation, the couple closed up their pub and moved back to Thomastown. Here, Freney fell in with the Kellymount highway gang, led by fellow Thomastown man John Reddy. Their colleagues would in time number Richard Dooling, John Anderson, Felix Donnelly, James Bolger, Michael Millea, John Reddy, George Roberts, Edmond Kenny, James Larrassy and a man called Hackett.

Proclaimed an outlaw in January 1748 (old calendar), Freney surrendered in April 1749. Joseph Robbins's brother, a lawyer, and Lord Carrick helped Freney work out a deal with the chief justices in which Freney would be allowed to emigrate. It is believed this deal was procured because the authorities feared executing him would make him a folk hero and lead to further disturbances.

The rest of the Kellymount band were not so lucky. Bolger, Kenny, Larrassy, Millea, Reddy, Hackett, Dooling and Roberts all went to the gallows. Reddy was imprisoned while Donnelly escaped to England but was eventually hanged in Kilkenny.

Later life
His autobiography, The Life and Adventures of Mr James Freney, was a huge success upon its publication in 1754. Thackeray, in reading the book, delighted in Freney's "noble naïveté and simplicity of the hero as he recounts his own adventures". Thackeray includes Freney in the novel The Luck of Barry Lyndon, where he has Barry encounter Freney on the highway. The incident appears also in the film Barry Lyndon (in the film, Barry refers to the man about to rob him as "Feeney"). Local landmarks named after him include Freney's Rock and Freney's Well, and he was the hero of The Ballad of the Bold Captain.

Death
It is not known where or how long he was abroad, if at all, but by 1776 he had settled at the port of New Ross and worked as a customs official, a post he held until his death in on 20 December 1788. He was buried in Inistioge.

Works

The Life and Adventures of James Freney, commonly called Captain Freney (Dublin: S. Powell 1754), 146pp.; Do., (Dublin: C.M. Warren 1861); reprinted as The Life and Adventures of James Freney, Together with an Account of the Actions of Several other Highwaymen ([n. pub]: 1900; 1981), 130pp.[Reproduction of original published in 1861 by C. M. Warren, Dublin ; from microfilm of original in National Library of Ireland. Label on title page reads : "This autobiography of James Freney, the legendary "Robinhood of Ireland", ...]; Frank McEvoy, ed., Life and Adventures of James Freney (Kilkenny: Hebron 1988), 84pp. ill. by David Holohan.

Sources 

 W. M. Thackeray [as ‘M. A. Titmarsh’], The Irish Sketch Book [first edn. 1842], ed. John A. Gamble (Belfast: Blackstaff 1985), pp. 163–79.
 Samuel Carter Hall & Anna Maria Hall, Ireland: Its Scenery, Character, etc. 3 vols. (London: Hall, Virtue & Co. 1841-43), 8o.; reprinted as Hall's Ireland: Mr & Mrs Hall's Tour of 1840, ed. Michael Scott, 2 vols., London: Sphere 1984), 1984 edn. Vol. 2, p. 426.
 Mary Campbell, review of Life and Adventures of James Freney, ed. Frank McEvoy (Kilkenny: Hebron 1988), in Books Ireland, No.159 (May 1992), pp. 96–97.
 Oxford Companion to Irish History, edited S.J. Connolly, Oxford, 1999.
 Niall Ó Ciosáin, ‘Freney, James (d. 1788)’, first published Sept 2004, 320 words, Oxford University Press.

1788 deaths
People from Thomastown
Irish highwaymen
Customs officers
Irish autobiographers
1719 births
18th-century Irish people